Reginald Wooster (19 January 1903 – 12 September 1968) was an English cricketer.  Wooster was a right-handed batsman who bowled right-arm medium pace.  He was born at Kettering, Northamptonshire.

Wooster made a single first-class appearance for Northamptonshire against Dublin University in 1925.  In his match, he took the wicket of James Wills for the cost of 23 runs from 9 overs.  He followed this up by scoring 6 runs in Northamptonshire's only innings of the match, before being dismissed by James Willis.  In Dublin University's second-innings, Wooster took 5 wickets for the cost of 54 runs from 13 overs. Wooster's final three wickets were taken with consecutive balls and this is the only case of a bowler getting a hat-trick in his only first class match. Despite this, he never played for Northamptonshire again. According to Keith Walmsley author of Brief Candles, a book about cricketers who only played in one first-class match, Wooster was invited to play for Northamptonshire on further occasions but had to decline due to business commitments. 

He died at the town of his birth on 12 September 1968.

References

External links
Reginald Wooster at ESPNcricinfo
Reginald Wooster at CricketArchive

1903 births
1968 deaths
Sportspeople from Kettering
English cricketers
Northamptonshire cricketers